"T-R-O-U-B-L-E" is a song written by Jerry Chesnut and recorded by Elvis Presley in March 1975. It was released as a single, as 
the A-side, with the B-side "Mr. Songman", through  RCA Victor that was taken from his album Today. It is not to be confused with the Leiber and Stoller song "Trouble", that Presley first recorded in July 1958, and which was subsequently recorded by numerous other artists.

Background and writing
Jerry Chesnut wrote the song in 1975, taking inspiration from a singer and pianist named Little David Wilkins. He said that, when writing the title, he thought of a woman walking through the door and causing trouble; he added that he spelled out the word "trouble", then the words "alone" and "looking", and found that they rhymed when spelled out.

Content
The male narrator is a musician who performs at various nightclubs as his main source of income, especially during late-night hours. During a performance at one particular club, the narrator notices a rather attractive young female entering the club by herself. The narrator concurrently begins to boast about the female's characteristics and features, and implies a great sense of trouble (hence the song's hook, "I smell T-R-O-U-B-L-E") that the female could cause as a result, such as bringing her attractiveness to the attention of males that notice or approach her, and subsequently inflicting jealousy among other females with characteristics somewhat less appealing than hers.

Chart performance

Personnel
Sourced from Keith Flynn and RCA session logs.
 Elvis Presley – lead vocals, harmony vocals
 James Burton – lead guitar
 John Wilkinson — electric rhythm guitar 
 Charlie Hodge — acoustic rhythm guitar; backing vocals (uncertain)
 Duke Bardwell — bass guitar
 Glen Hardin — piano
 Ron Tutt — drums
 David Briggs – clavinet
 Voice (Donnie Sumner, Sherrill Nielsen, Tim Baty, Thomas Hensley) – backing vocals

Travis Tritt version

This song was recorded in 1992 by American country music singer Travis Tritt. It was the third single released from his 1992 album of the same name. It peaked at #13 in the United States, and #17 in Canada. It was later featured in the 1996 film Tremors 2: Aftershocks.

Personnel

 Sam Bacco – tambourine, percussion
 Mike Brignardello – bass guitar
 Larry Byrom – acoustic guitar, slide guitar
 John Cowan – backing vocals
 Jack Holder – electric guitar
 John Jorgenson – electric guitar
 Billy Livsey – Hammond organ, clavinet
 Dana McVicker – backing vocals
 Hargus "Pig" Robbins – piano
 Jimmy Joe Ruggiere – harmonica
 Travis Tritt – vocals
 Steve Turner – drums
 Billy Joe Walker Jr. – electric guitar
 Reggie Young – electric guitar

Critical reception
Geoffrey Himes, of Billboard magazine, reviewed the song favorably, saying that Tritt transforms it with "boogie-woogie piano, slide guitar and super-fast tempo into a bar romp reminiscent of Little Feat."

Music video
The music video was directed by Jack Cole. It features Tritt singing the song on a stage surrounded by a huge crowd. Later, he jumps into the crowd to look for a certain girl.

Charts

References

1975 songs
1975 singles
1993 singles
Elvis Presley songs
Travis Tritt songs
Songs written by Jerry Chesnut
RCA Victor singles
Warner Records Nashville singles